Yıldıray Pağda (born 1939) is a Turkish athlete. He competed in the men's triple jump at the 1960 Summer Olympics.

References

1939 births
Living people
Athletes (track and field) at the 1960 Summer Olympics
Turkish male triple jumpers
Olympic athletes of Turkey
Sportspeople from Adana